The following are the national records in athletics in Senegal maintained by its national athletics federation: Fédération Sénégalaise d'Athlétisme (FSA).

Outdoor

Key to tables:

+ = en route to a longer distance

h = hand timing

A = affected by altitude

Men

Women

Indoor

Men

Women

Notes

References

External links
FSA web site
Senegalese Athletics Records – Outdoor

Senegal
Records
Athletics